Jesús Fernández Hernández (born August 6, 1975 in Villena, Alicante) is a Spanish basketball player, playing the power forward position.

Fernández spent all his career between Liga ACB and LEB Oro, despite spending one year in Mexico. He decided to retire in May 2015, after promoting with Fundación CB Granada to LEB Plata, but finally continued playing in the debut of the team in the third tier.

Honors 
Clubs Honors
Copa del Rey: 1998 with Pamesa Valencia
Copa LEB Plata: 2017 with Covirán Granada
Senior national team honors
Gold medal at the 2001 Mediterranean Games

References

External links 
 ACB Profile

1975 births
Living people
Baloncesto Fuenlabrada players
CB Granada players
CB Lucentum Alicante players
Fundación CB Granada players
Halcones de Xalapa players
Liga ACB players
Menorca Bàsquet players
Power forwards (basketball)
Spanish expatriate basketball people in Mexico
Spanish men's basketball players
Valencia Basket players
BC Andorra players
Spanish expatriate basketball people in Andorra
Club Ourense Baloncesto players
Mediterranean Games gold medalists for Spain
Competitors at the 2001 Mediterranean Games
Mediterranean Games medalists in basketball